Tom Dowdall (1926 – 11 October 2010) was an Irish rower. He competed in the men's eight event at the 1948 Summer Olympics.

References

External links
 

1926 births
2010 deaths
Irish male rowers
Olympic rowers of Ireland
Rowers at the 1948 Summer Olympics
Place of birth missing